The Australian Heritage Database is a searchable online database of heritage sites in Australia. It is maintained by the Department of Agriculture, Water and the Environment , in consultation with Australian Heritage Council. There are more than 20,000 entries in the database, which includes natural, historic and Indigenous heritage places, held in separately maintained lists.

Description
Included in the database are places or items:
 the World Heritage List, places that are of outstanding universal value and have been included on this United Nations Educational, Scientific and Cultural Organisation (UNESCO) managed list;
 the National Heritage List, a long list of natural, historic and Indigenous places that are of outstanding national heritage value to the Australian nation;
 the Commonwealth Heritage List, a list of natural, historic and Indigenous places of heritage significance owned or controlled by the Australian Government;
 the Register of the National Estate, a list of natural, historic and Indigenous heritage places throughout Australia, frozen in February 2007 and replaced by the Australian National Heritage List and the Commonwealth Heritage List;
 the List of Overseas Places of Historic Significance (LOPHSA), a list which recognises symbolically sites of outstanding historic significance to Australia that are located outside the Australian jurisdiction; and
 other places being considered for listing in one of these lists.

Photographs
Photographs of listed places are included (if available) through links to the Australian Heritage Photographic Library. There is a separate search facility for searching the photos only.

See also
 Australasian Underwater Cultural Heritage Database –  shipwrecks, sunken aircraft and other types of underwater heritage sites and artefacts
 Australian Heritage Council –  principal adviser to the Australian Government on heritage matters
 List of heritage registers (worldwide)

References

External links
 
Search page

Heritage registers in Australia
Government of Australia
Scientific databases
Databases in Australia